The 1960 University of Oxford election for the position of Chancellor was called upon the death of the incumbent Chancellor, Lord Halifax, on 23 December 1959. It was the first election for Oxford Chancellor to be contested since 1925.

Electorate
The electorate consisted of all members of the University holding the rank of Master of Arts, of which there were around 30,000 at the time. Votes had to be cast in person at Oxford in academic dress. The election was by first past the post. To stand a candidate had to be nominated by two electors.

Candidates
At first, the university authorities came up with only one candidate, the wealthy Chairman of Lloyds Bank and former British Ambassador to Washington Sir Oliver Franks.

However, Hugh Trevor-Roper, installed less than three years earlier as Regius Professor of Modern History by the Prime Minister Harold Macmillan, proposed the Prime Minister as an alternative candidate.

Course of the election
Trevor-Roper orchestrated the Macmillan campaign, writing to graduates to encourage them to travel to Oxford to vote for Macmillan.

Result
The results were as follows:

See also
List of chancellors of the University of Oxford

References
Sisman, Adam (2010). Hugh Trevor-Roper, London: WEIDENFELD & NICOLSON, pp. 313–7. 

1960
University of Oxford Chancellor election
University of Oxford Chancellor election
20th century in Oxford
March 1960 events in the United Kingdom
Harold Macmillan